Great North (Grande Nord, GN) is a liberal, regionalist, federalist and somewhat separatist political party, based in Northern Italy. The party proposes federalism and liberal economics, aimed at reducing "the size of the state in order to free enterprises, workers and communities, always putting who works and produce first". GN also adheres to the Oxford Manifesto, and the values of the Liberal International.

History
The party was founded in December 2017, by prominent former members of Lega Nord (LN), including Marco Reguzzoni (leader of The Republicans), Roberto Bernardelli (leader of Padanian Union, Lombard Independence and "Make the North Great Again"), Fabrizio Comencini (leader of Liga Veneta Repubblica, member of Independence We Veneto), Angelo Alessandri (leader of I Change), Giuseppe Leoni, Oreste Rossi, Francesca Martini and Marco Desiderati. Some of them (Reguzzoni, Alessandri, Leoni, Rossi, Martini and Desiderati) had been loyalists of Umberto Bossi, founder and leader of LN until April 2012, and had left that party in opposition to Roberto Maroni and Matteo Salvini, Bossi's successors; others (Bernardelli and Comencini) had opposed Bossi, and left the LN decades ago.

All of them opposed the leadership of Salvini for its populist turn and his Italian national strategy. Bossi attended the party's founding convention, but did not join. In the general election of 2018, GN fielded candidates only in a few constituencies and obtained a mere 0.1% of the vote.

Electoral results

Italian Parliament

Regional Councils

External links 

Official website

References

2017 establishments in Italy
Political parties established in 2017
Regionalist parties in Italy
Liberal parties in Italy